Beatrix is a Latin feminine given name, most likely derived from Viatrix, a feminine form of the Late Latin name Viator which meant "voyager, traveller" and later influenced in spelling by association with the Latin word beatus or "blessed". Another North American English pronunciation however approximates that of most other languages:  , as shown by US dictionary entries for the former queen of the Netherlands. 

Common forms of this name include Beatrice in English and Italian, Béatrice in French, Beatriz in Spanish and Portuguese, Beate in German, and Beata in Polish and Swedish. Common short forms are Bea and Trixie. See Beatrice (given name) for other derivatives.

People

Saints 

 Saint Beatrix (died ca. 303), Christian martyr, in older sources named Viatrix ("the traveler").
 Saint Beatrix d'Este (1226?-1262), Italian Benedictine nun, niece of above
 Blessed Beatrix or Beatrix of Nazareth (1200–1268), Flemish Cistercian nun, mystic and author
 Beatrix d'Ornacieux (c.1240-c.1306/9), French Carthusian nun
 Beatrix da Silva (1424–1492), Portuguese Franciscan nun

Nobility 

 Beatrix de Courtenay (died 1245), Countess of Edessa
 Beatrix de Vesci, (died c. 1125), Anglo-Norman noble
 Beatrix of Andechs-Merania (1210–1271), German noble
 Beatrix of Aragon (1457–1508), Queen consort of Hungary and Bohemia
 Beatrix of Baden (1492–1535), Margravine of Baden
 Beatrix of Bar (c.1017 – 1076), marchioness of Tuscany
 Beatrix of Bavaria (1344–1359), Queen consort of Sweden
 Beatrix of Brandenburg (d. 1314), wife of Henry II, Lord of Mecklenburg
 Beatrix of Falkenburg (1254–1277), queen consort of the Romans
 Beatrix of Franconia (1037–1061), German Abbess and daughter of Holy Roman Emperor Henry III
 Beatrix of Luxembourg (1305–1319), Queen consort of Hungary
 Beatrix of Nuremberg (c.1362 – 1414), Duchess of Austria
 Beatrix of Silesia (1290–1322), queen consort of the Romans
 Beatrix of Swabia (1198–1212), Holy Roman Empress
 Beatrix of the Netherlands (born 1938), queen regnant from 1980–2013
 Beatrix, Countess of Schönburg-Glauchau (1930–2021), Countess consort of Schönburg-Glauchau
 Queen Beatrix (disambiguation)

Given name 

 Beatrix Balogh (b. 1974), Hungarian handball player
 Beatrix Beauclerk, Duchess of St Albans (1877–1953), English peer
 Béatrix Beck (1914–2008), French writer
 Beatrix Borchard (born 1950), German musicologist and author
 Beatrix Boulsevicz (b. 1987), Hungarian swimmer
 Beatrix Campbell (b. 1947), British journalist and author
 Béatrix de Choiseul-Stainville (1729–1794), French salonnière and bibliophile
 Beatrix Christian, Australian playwright and screenwriter
 Béatrix de Cusance (1614–1663), Duchess of Lorraine
 Beatrix Dobie (1887-1945), New Zealand landscape artist
 Beatrix D'Souza (b. 1935), Indian politician and social worker
 Béatrix Dussane (1888–1969), French stage actress
 Beatrix Farrand (1872–1959), American landscape gardener and landscape architect
 Beatrix Galindo (c.1465–1534), Spanish physician and educator
 Beatrix Hamburg (1923–2018), American psychiatrist
 Beatrix Havergal (1901–1980), English horticulturist
 Beatrix Holéczy (born 1972), Hungarian biathlete
 Beatrix von Holte (1250–1327), German abbess
 Beatrix Hoyt (1880–1963), American golfing champion
 Beatrix Jones Farrand (1872–1959), American landscape architect
 Beatrix Kisházi (b. 1946), Hungarian table tennis player
 Beatrix Kökény (b. 1969), Hungarian handball player
 Béatrix La Palme (1878–1921), Canadian soprano and violinist
 Beatrix Lambton, Countess of Durham (1859–1937), British peer
 Beatrix Lehmann (1903–1979), British actress, theatre director and author
 Beatrix Leslie (c.1577-1661), Scottish midwife executed for witchcraft
 Beatrix Loughran (1900–1975), American figure skater
 Beatrix Lyall (1873–1948), British social reformer and politician
 Beatrix Mahlknecht, Italian luger
 Beatrix Waring McCay (1901–1972), Australian barrister
 Béatrix Midant-Reynes, French Egyptologist
 Beatrix Miller (1923–2014), British editor of Queen and Vogue magazines
 Beatrix Müllner (b. 1970), Austrian synchronized swimmer
 Beatrix Ong (b. 1976), British luxury goods designer
 Beatrix Maud Palmer (1858–1950), British political and women's rights activist
 Beatrix Pesek, Hungarian ten-pin bowler
 Beatrix Potter (1866–1943), English illustrator, author and conservationist
 Beatrix Rechner (born 1951), Swiss high jumper
 Beatrix de Rijk (1883–1958), Dutch aviator
 Beatrix de Rijke (1421–1468), Dutch foundling
 Beatrix Ruf (b. 1960), German art curator
 Beatrix Schröer (b. 1963), German rower
 Beatrix Schuba (b. 1951), Austrian figure skater
 Beatrix Sherman (1894–1975), American silhouette artist
 Beatrix von Storch (b. 1971), German politician
 Beatrix Tóth (b. 1967), Hungarian handball player

Surname 

 Jean-Guillaume Béatrix (b. 1988), French biathlete

Fictional characters 

 Beatrix, mother of the legendary Knight of the Swan
 Beatrix Cenci, protagonist of an opera based on the Italian noblewoman Beatrice Cenci (1577–1599)
 Beatrix Kiddo, the protagonist of the Kill Bill films.
 Beatrix MacMillan, Doctor Who companion
 Béatrix de Rochefide, the protagonist of Balzac's novel Béatrix.
 Beatrix "Trixie" Belden, title character in a series of 'girl detective' mysteries
 General Beatrix, a character in the video game Final Fantasy IX.
 Beatrix "Trixie" Franklin, nurse and midwife from Call the Midwife
 Beatrix, one of the main character from Netflix Original Series Fate: The Winx Saga
 , a character in Moe! Ninja Girls RPG and Moe! Ninja Girls: Visual Novel
 Beatrix, a playable character in the video game Mobile Legends: Bang Bang

Other 

 83 Beatrix, a large asteroid in the inner part of the main asteroid belt
 Beata Beatrix, 1870 painting of Dante's Beatrice by Dante Gabriel Rossetti
 BeatrIX, a Linux operating system in 2004/5
 Béatrix, 1839 novel by French author Honoré de Balzac.
 Beatrix Gold Mine, South African gold mine owned by Gold Fields
 Sainte-Béatrix, Quebec, a municipality in Canada
 Beatrix, a song by Cocteau Twins on their 1984 album Treasure

See also 

 Beat (name)
 Beatrice (given name)
 Beatus (disambiguation)

References 

Feminine given names
Dutch feminine given names
Hungarian feminine given names
English feminine given names